Minhaj ul Muslimeen is an Islamic encyclopedia for all matters in the life of a Muslim. The book was initially compiled by Masood Ahmad. The book draws on the Quran and Sunnah. It was published in Urdu with Arabic citations.

The book can be downloaded in pdf format from the internet.

References
Download/View Minhaj-ul-Muslimeen
Jamaat-ul-Muslimeen's official website
Jamaat-ul-Muslimeen's official Urdu Website
Muslimeen mailing list
Tamil webpage of Jamaat-ul-Muslimeen

Urdu-language encyclopedias
Encyclopedias of Islam